Whitey can refer to:

People
 Whitey Alperman (1879–1942), MLB player
 Richie Ashburn (1927–1997), MLB player and broadcaster
 James Wellwood "Whitey" Basson (born 8 January 1946), South African businessman 
 Whitey Bimstein (1897–1969), boxer and boxing trainer
 Whitey Bulger (1929–2018), crime boss of organized crime group in the Boston area in the 1970s and 1980s
 Whitey Ford (1928–2020), Major League Baseball (MLB) pitcher
 Whitey Glazner (1893–1989), MLB pitcher
 Roy Grant (1916–2010), of the American country music duo Whitey and Hogan
 Whitey Harrison (1913–1993), American surfer and surf equipment innovator
 Whitey Herzog (born 1931), MLB player and manager
 Whitey Krakow (died 1941), New York mobster and hitman for Murder, Inc.
 Whitey Kurowski (1919–1999), MLB player
 Whitey Lockman (1926–2009), MLB player, coach, manager and executive 
 Whitey Mitchell (1932–2009), American jazz bassist and television writer and producer
 Whitey Moore (1912–1987), MLB pitcher
 Whitey Von Nieda (born 1922), National Basketball Association player, basketball coach
 Whitey Platt (1920–1970), MLB player
 Sanger D. Shafer (born 1934), American country music songwriter and musician
 Myer Skoog (born 1926), National Basketball Association player
 Whitey Thomas (1895–1978), American football player
 Herbert "Whitey" White, leader of Whitey's Lindy Hoppers, the most notable dance troupe of the Lindy Hop Aerials Era
 Whitey Wietelmann (1919–2002), MLB player and coach
 Whitey Wilshere (1912–1985), MLB pitcher
 Whitey Wistert (1912–1985), American football and baseball player, member of the College Football Hall of Fame
 Whitey Witt (1895–1988), MLB player
 Harry Wolfe (baseball) (1888–1971), MLB player
 Whitey Woodin (1894–after 1935), American football player
 Whitey (musician), born Nathan Joseph White, British electro-rock musician

Fictional characters
 Aelfyre Whitemane, in the Marvel Comics series Power Pack
 Whitey Durham, on the television series One Tree Hill
 Whitey, from Judge Dredd

Other uses
 Whitey (drugs), a slang term associated with certain forms of recreational drug use
 Whitey (slang), a derogatory term for white people
 Whitey (band), a Denton, Texas funk band
 Whitey: United States of America v. James J. Bulger, a 2014 documentary film
 Whitey (film), a 1980 Belgian movie
 Whitey's Ice Cream, an ice cream manufacturer and line of ice cream shops in the Midwestern United States
 Whitey, an informal name for the White River Monster

See also
 Whity (film), a 1971 German film
 Whitey tape incident, a 2008 political dirty trick by Larry C. Johnson

Lists of people by nickname